The 1975–76 Michigan Wolverines men's basketball team represented the University of Michigan in intercollegiate college basketball during the 1975–76 season. The team played its home games in the Crisler Arena in Ann Arbor, Michigan, and was a member of the Big Ten Conference.  Under the direction of head coach Johnny Orr, the team finished second in the Big Ten Conference.

The team lost to all four ranked opponents it played during the regular season.  However, the team earned the third of four consecutive NCAA Division I men's basketball tournament invitations, and it defeated the first three ranked opponents that it faced in the tournament. Wayman Britt served as team captain, and Rickey Green earned team MVP. As a team, it led the conference in scoring offense with an 85.8 average in conference games as well as in field goal percentage with a 52.1%.

The team began the season ranked sixteenth and  peaked at ninth, where it finished the season in the Associated Press Top 20 Poll. It was ranked for a total of 16 out of 17 weeks during the season.  The team also ended the season ranked ninth in the final UPI Coaches' Poll.

That season, Hubbard set the current school record for single-season rebounds by a freshman of 352.  The team set a new school record by totaling 2753 points over the course of the season. The record would last for eleven seasons.  The team set the school single-season total assist record of 600.

This surpassed the 17-game streak from December 1, 1964 – January 29, 1966, and stood as the longest home winning streak in school history until a 24-game streak that started on January 5, 1985.

In the 32-team 1976 NCAA Division I men's basketball tournament, Michigan reached the championship game by winning the Midwest region.  In so doing they defeated the  74–73, the Notre Dame Fighting Irish 80–76 and the  95–88. Then in the final four, the team defeated the previously unbeaten Rutgers Scarlet Knights 86–70 before losing in the championship game to the unbeaten Indiana Hoosiers 86–68.

Regular season
The team set the school record by totaling 2753 points during its 32-game season.  The record lasted until 1987.  The team also set the school record for field goal percentage (.510, 1138-for-2231), which would last for five seasons.

Statistics
The team posted the following statistics:

Rankings

NCAA tournament
Midwest
Michigan 74, Wichita State 73
Michigan 80, Notre Dame 76
Michigan 95, Missouri 88
Final Four
Michigan 86, Rutgers 70
Indiana 86, Michigan 68

Awards and honors

Team players drafted into the NBA
Seven players from this team were selected in the NBA Draft.

References

Michigan
Michigan Wolverines men's basketball seasons
NCAA Division I men's basketball tournament Final Four seasons
Michigan
Michigan Wolve
Michigan Wolve